The Hannover Marathon is an annual road running event featuring races over the marathon, half marathon and 10 km distance that is held in May in the city of Hannover, Germany. Over 15,000 people took part in the day's races at the 2011 edition of the event. The half marathon attracts the highest number of entries from the public (over 5000) while the marathon race typically features up to 2000 runners annually.

The marathon race holds IAAF Silver Label status and it is part of the German Road Races group. The race is officially known as the HAJ Hannover Marathon, as Hannover Airport is the current title sponsor. Previous race names include the Energie Hannover Marathon (1999 to 2001) and the Spielbanken Niedersachsen Marathon (2002 to 2007).

The marathon has elite level participants and German, East African and Eastern European runners have been the most successful in this category. The course records were both broken in 2013: South Africa's Lusapho April has the men's best of 2:08:32 hours while Olena Burkovska holds the women's record of 2:27:07 hours. Natalia Galushko has won the race the most times, with three straight wins from 1995 to 1997, while Stephan Freigang and Andrey Gordayev are the most successful male runners, having both had two back-to-back wins.

The 2020 and 2021 editions of the race were cancelled due to the COVID-19 pandemic.

Winners

Key:

Multiple wins

By country

References

List of winners
Hannover Marathon. Association of Road Racing Statisticians (2012-05-07). Retrieved on 2012-05-20.

External links

Official website

Marathons in Germany
Sport in Hanover
Recurring sporting events established in 1991
Spring (season) events in Germany
Inline speed skating competitions